The 2015 UNAF U-17 Tournament was the 12th edition of the UNAF U-17 Tournament. The tournament took place in Rabat, Morocco, on June 7-11, 2015.

Participants
 (hosts)

 (invited)

Venues
 Complexe Sportif de Salé of the Académie Mohamed VI, Salé

Tournament

Champions

References

2015 in African football
2015
2015